Teodoro Higuera Valenzuela (born November 9, 1957) is a Mexican former professional baseball pitcher. He played Major League Baseball (MLB) for the Milwaukee Brewers.

Early career
Higuera was named the rookie of the year with the Indios de Ciudad Juárez during the 1981 Mexican League season. In 1983, his contract was purchased by the Brewers. After one year in the minor leagues, Higuera earned a spot in the team's 1985 rotation after winning a competition with Japanese pitcher Yutaka Enatsu. In his first season with Milwaukee, he posted a 15–8 record with a 3.90 ERA en route to winning The Sporting News Rookie of the Year Award in 1985.

 was one of Higuera's best seasons.  He had his only 20-win season, going 20–11 with 207 strikeouts and a 2.79 ERA.  It was the first 20-win season by a Mexican-born pitcher in the American League.  That season, he was also selected for his only All-Star Game appearance.  In the game, Fernando Valenzuela struck Higuera out in the fifth inning to tie Carl Hubbell's All-Star record with five consecutive strikeouts.

He followed up his 1986 campaign by winning 18 games in 1987 and setting team marks for strikeouts (240) and consecutive scoreless innings (32).

Over his first four years in the league, Higuera had a won loss record of 69–38, 766 strikeouts and a 3.25 ERA and was poised for greater success.  However, he began to suffer injury problems that would limit his playing time.

Injuries and retirement
Back surgery and sprained ankles limited Higuera to 22 starts in 1989, although he came back to go 9–6. He was healthy for most of 1990 but had a record of 11–10 with 129 strikeouts. Nevertheless, the Brewers were convinced that he could return to form and signed him to a four-year, $13.1 million contract.

Higuera tore his rotator cuff in 1991 and endured several surgeries. He missed the entire 1992 season and saw limited action in 1993 and 1994. He did not make the team and retired that season.

Post-retirement
Higuera has served as a pitching coach for his native Mexico in the 2006, 2009, and 2013 World Baseball Classic. In 2011, Higuera was inducted into the Mexican Professional Baseball Hall of Fame.

References

External links

1957 births
Living people
American League All-Stars
Baseball players from Sinaloa
Beloit Brewers players
Denver Zephyrs players
El Paso Diablos players
Indios de Ciudad Juárez (minor league) players
Major League Baseball pitchers
Major League Baseball players from Mexico
Mexican Baseball Hall of Fame inductees
Mexican expatriate baseball players in Canada
Mexican expatriate baseball players in the United States
Mexican League baseball pitchers
Milwaukee Brewers players
New Orleans Zephyrs players
Sportspeople from Los Mochis
Sultanes de Monterrey players
Vancouver Canadians players